Simon Everett Lantz (April 12, 1872 – December 27, 1952) was an American farmer, livestock breeder, and politician.

Biography
Born in Carlock, Illinois, Lantz went to the public schools and University of Illinois. He lived in Congerville, Illinois and was a farmer and livestock breeder. Lantz served on the Woodford County, Illinois Board of Commissioners and was chairman of the county board. In 1915, Lantz served in the Illinois House of Representatives and was a Republican. Lantz then served in the Illinois State Senate from 1917 until his death in 1952. Lantz died in a hospital in Peoria, Illinois after suffering a heart attack at his home in Congerville.

References

External links

1872 births
1952 deaths
People from McLean County, Illinois
People from Woodford County, Illinois
University of Illinois alumni
Farmers from Illinois
County commissioners in Illinois
Republican Party members of the Illinois House of Representatives
Republican Party Illinois state senators